Jerrod Sessler (born August 26, 1969) is an American former NASCAR driver. He drove the #4 Ford Taurus in the Whelen All-American Series and the now-defunct NASCAR Northwest Series, which also had Greg Biffle and Kevin Hamlin as drivers.

From 1987 to 1989, Sessler was a Navy Petty Officer 3rd Class on the USS Constellation (CV-64). He is a Stage IV cancer survivor who maintains a vegan, raw foods diet.

He is the founder of HomeTask.com.  One subsidiary, Yellow Van Handyman, was recognized by Entrepreneur magazine as a "Franchise 500" firm in 2008, 2009, 2011 & 2013.

He ran for the United States House of Representatives in 2022 as a member of the Republican Party in Washington's 4th congressional district against incumbent Dan Newhouse, but lost in the primary.

Sessler was in Washington D.C. when the attack on the Capitol occurred, and subsequently stated that he did not breach into the Capitol. Sessler has made unsubstantiated claims that the riot was a "setup" perpetrated by paid "agitators" and the FBI meant to discredit Donald Trump and his supporters. He has made false and discredited claims of election fraud in regards to the 2020 presidential election, including claims that Trump won.

Tax issues 
In 2022, The Tri-City Herald newspaper reported that taxes were past due on Sessler's Benton County property.

Accusation of threats 
In 2022, Sessler was accused of making threats towards a Benton County code enforcement officer when he visited Sessler's property to investigate a claim that someone on his property was living in a house under construction. As reported by AOL, Sessler told the officer that he would get his gun and "deal with him" if the officer returned to the property.

References

External links
 

1969 births
Candidates in the 2022 United States House of Representatives elections
Living people
NASCAR drivers
Racing drivers from Washington (state)
Sportspeople from King County, Washington